Sing into My Mouth is a covers album by Iron & Wine and Ben Bridwell of Band of Horses that was released on July 17, 2015. The album's title is a lyric from the Talking Heads song "This Must Be the Place (Naive Melody)".

Reception
Sing into My Mouth has been given a Metacritic score of 61 based on 17 reviews, indicating generally favorable reviews.

The album debuted at No. 116 on Billboard 200, and No. 14 on Top Rock Albums. with around 4,000 copies sold in its first week.  It has sold 14,000 copies in the United States as of April 2016.

Track listing 
"This Must Be the Place (Naive Melody)" (David Byrne, Chris Frantz, Jerry Harrison, and Tina Weymouth) – Talking Heads 3:31
"Done This One Before" (Ronnie Lane) – Ronnie Lane 2:59
"Any Day Woman" (Paul Siebel) – Bonnie Raitt 2:50
"You Know Me More Than I Know" (John Cale) – John Cale 3:29
"Bulletproof Soul" (Helen Adu, Andrew Hale, Stuart Matthewman) – Sade 4:39
"There's No Way Out of Here" (Kenneth Baker) – Unicorn 4:38
"God Knows (You Gotta Give to Get)" (Sarah Assbring) – El Perro del Mar 3:22
"The Straight and Narrow" (Jason Pierce) – Spiritualized 5:15
"Magnolia" (JJ Cale) –  3:51
"Am I a Good Man?" (Willie Clarke) – Them Two 3:47
"Ab's Song" (Toy Caldwell) – Marshall Tucker Band 1:19
"Coyote, My Little Brother" (Peter La Farge) – Peter La Farge 5:05

Charts

References

2015 albums
Collaborative albums
Covers albums
Iron & Wine albums
Self-released albums